The David di Donatello Award for Best Supporting Actress is a film award presented annually by the Accademia del Cinema Italiano (ACI, Academy of Italian Cinema) to recognize the outstanding performance in a supporting role of an actress who has worked within the Italian film industry during the year preceding the ceremony. It has been awarded every year since 1981.

Winners and nominees
Winners are indicated in bold.

1980s
1981
Maddalena Crippa – Three Brothers (ex aequo) 
Ida Di Benedetto – Camera d'albergo (ex aequo) 
Laura Antonelli – Passion of Love

1982
Alida Valli – La caduta degli angeli ribelli
Piera Degli Esposti – Sweet Dreams
Valeria D'Obici – Piso pisello

1983
Virna Lisi – Time for Loving (ex aequo)
Lina Polito – Sorry for the delay (ex aequo)
Milena Vukotic – My Friends Act III

1984
Elena Fabrizi – Acqua e sapone
Stefania Casini – Lontano da dove
Rossana Di Lorenzo – Ballando ballando
Anna Longhi – Il tassinaro

1985
Marina Confalone – Così parlò Bellavista
Valeria D'Obici – A Proper Scandal
Ida Di Benedetto – Pizza Connection

1986
Athina Cenci – Let's Hope It's a Girl
Stefania Sandrelli – Let's Hope It's a Girl
Isa Danieli – Camorra (A Story of Streets, Women and Crime)

1987
Lina Sastri – The Inquiry
Valentina Cortese – Via Montenapoleone
Stefania Sandrelli – The Bride Was Beautiful

1988
Elena Sofia Ricci – Io e mia sorella
Vivian Wu – The last emperor
Silvana Mangano – Dark Eyes
Marthe Keller – Dark Eyes

1989
Athina Cenci – Compagni di scuola
Pupella Maggio – Cinema Paradiso
Pamela Villoresi – Splendor

1990s
1990
Nancy Brilli – Little Misunderstandings
Stefania Sandrelli – Dark Illness
Pamela Villoresi – Evelina e i suoi figli
Mariella Valentini – Red Wood Pigeon
Amanda Sandrelli – Amori in corso

1991
Zoe Incrocci – Verso sera
Vana Barba – Mediterraneo
Milena Vukotic – Fantozzi alla riscossa
Mariella Valentini – To Want to Fly
Anne Roussel – The Yes Man
Alida Valli – La bocca

1992
Elisabetta Pozzi – Damned the Day I Met You
Angela Finocchiaro – The Invisible Wall
Cinzia Leone – Women in Skirts

1993
Marina Confalone – Arriva la bufera
Alessia Fugardi – The Great Pumpkin
Monica Scattini – Another Life

1994
Monica Scattini – Maniaci sentimentali
Regina Bianchi – Il giudice ragazzino
Stefania Sandrelli – Per amore, solo per amore

1995
Angela Luce – L'amore molesto
Virna Lisi – La Reine Margot
Ottavia Piccolo – Bidoni

1996
Marina Confalone – La seconda volta
Stefania Sandrelli – Ninfa plebea
Lina Sastri – Vite strozzate

1997
Barbara Enrichi – Il ciclone
Edi Angelillo – La bruttina stagionata
Andrea Ferreol – Sono pazzo di Iris Blond
Eva Grieco – Marianna Ucrìa
Lorenza Indovina – La tregua

1998
Nicoletta Braschi – Ovosodo
Athina Cenci – I miei più cari amici
Marina Confalone – La parola amore esiste

1999
Cecilia Dazzi – Matrimoni
Paola Tiziana Cruciani – Baci e abbracci
Lunetta Savino – Matrimoni

2000s
2000
Marina Massironi – Pane e tulipani
Rosalinda Celentano – Il dolce rumore della vita
Anna Galiena – Come te nessuno mai

2001
Stefania Sandrelli – L'ultimo bacio
Athina Cenci – Rosa e Cornelia
Jasmine Trinca – La stanza del figlio

2002
Stefania Sandrelli – Sons and Daughters
Rosalinda Celentano – L'amore probabilmente
Iaia Forte – Paz!

2003
Piera Degli Esposti – L'ora di religione
Monica Bellucci – Ricordati di me
Serra Yilmaz – La finestra di fronte
Francesca Neri – La felicità non costa niente
Nicoletta Romanoff – Ricordati di me

2004
Margherita Buy – Caterina va in città
Anna Maria Barbera – Il paradiso all'improvviso
Claudia Gerini – Non ti muovere
Jasmine Trinca – La meglio gioventù
Giselda Volodi – Agata e la tempesta

2005
Margherita Buy – Manual of Love
Erika Blanc – Sacred Heart
Lisa Gastoni – Sacred Heart
Giovanna Mezzogiorno – Love Returns
Galatea Ranzi – The Life That I Want

2006
Angela Finocchiaro – The Beast in the Heart
Isabella Ferrari – The Goodbye Kiss
Marisa Merlini – The Second Wedding Night
Stefania Rocca – The Beast in the Heart
Jasmine Trinca – The Caiman

2007
Ambra Angiolini – Saturn in Opposition
Angela Finocchiaro – My Brother is an Only Child
Michela Cescon – Salty Air
Francesca Neri – A Dinner for Them to Meet
Sabrina Impacciatore – Napoleon and Me

2008
Alba Rohrwacher – Days and Clouds
Carolina Crescentini – Speak to me of love
Isabella Ferrari – Caos calmo
Valeria Golino – Caos calmo
Sabrina Impacciatore – Miss F
Paola Cortellesi – Piano, solo

2009
Piera Degli Esposti – Il Divo
Sabrina Ferilli – Your Whole Life Ahead of You
Maria Nazionale – Gomorrah
Micaela Ramazzotti – Your Whole Life Ahead of You
Carla Signoris – Ex

2010s
2010
Ilaria Occhini – Loose Cannons
Anita Kravos – Raise Your Head
Alba Rohrwacher – The Man Who Will Come
Claudia Pandolfi – The First Beautiful Thing
Elena Sofia Ricci – Loose Cannons

2011
Valentina Lodovini – Welcome to the South
Barbora Bobuľová – La bellezza del somaro
Valeria De Franciscis – The Salt of Life
Anna Foglietta – Escort in Love
Claudia Potenza – Basilicata Coast to Coast

2012
Michela Cescon – Piazza Fontana: The Italian Conspiracy
Anita Caprioli – Heavenly Body
Margherita Buy – Habemus Papam
Cristiana Capotondi – Kryptonite!
Barbora Bobuľová – Easy!

2013
Maya Sansa – Dormant Beauty
Ambra Angiolini – Viva l'Italia
Anna Bonaiuto – Viva la libertà
Rosabell Laurenti Sellers – Balancing Act
Francesca Neri – A Perfect Family
Fabrizia Sacchi – A Five Star Life

2014
Valeria Golino – Human Capital
Claudia Gerini – Blame Freud
Paola Minaccioni – Fasten Your Seatbelts
Galatea Ranzi – The Great Beauty
Milena Vukotic – The Chair of Happiness

2015
Giulia Lazzarini – Mia Madre
Barbora Bobulova – Black Souls
Micaela Ramazzotti – An Italian Name
Valeria Golino – The Invisible Boy
Anna Foglietta – The Legendary Giulia and Other Miracles

2016
Antonia Truppo – Lo chiamavano Jeeg Robot
Piera Degli Esposti – Assolo
Elisabetta De Vito – Non essere cattivo
Sonia Bergamasco – Quo vado?
Claudia Cardinale – Ultima fermata

2017
Antonia Truppo – Indivisibili
Valentina Carnelutti – La pazza gioia
Valeria Golino – 
Michela Cescon – Piuma
Roberta Mattei – Veloce come il vento

2018
Claudia Gerini – Ammore e malavita
Sonia Bergamasco – Come un gatto in tangenziale
Micaela Ramazzotti – La tenerezza
Anna Bonaiuto – Napoli velata
Giulia Lazzarini – The Place

2019
Marina Confalone - The Vice of Hope
Donatella Finocchiaro - Capri-Revolution
Nicoletta Braschi - Happy as Lazzaro
Kasia Smutniak - Loro
Jasmine Trinca - On My Skin

2020s
2020
 Valeria Golino  - 5 Is the Perfect Number
 Anna Ferzetti - Domani è un altro giorno
 Tania Garribba - The First King: Birth of an Empire
 Maria Amato - The Traitor
 Alida Baldari Calabria - Pinocchio

References

External links
 
 David di Donatello official website

David di Donatello
Film awards for supporting actress